Zavera Snowfield is the glacier extending 18 km in north-south direction and 16 km in east-west direction on southern Trinity Peninsula in Graham Land, Antarctica.  It is located in the northeast foothills of Detroit Plateau, south of Diplock Glacier, north of Mount Wild and northeast of Kopito Ridge, and draining into Prince Gustav Channel in Weddell Sea.

The glacier is named after the Bulgarian liberation uprising of ‘Velchova Zavera’ in 1835.

Location

See also
 List of glaciers in the Antarctic
 Glaciology

Maps
 Antarctic Digital Database (ADD). Scale 1:250000 topographic map of Antarctica. Scientific Committee on Antarctic Research (SCAR). Since 1993, regularly upgraded and updated.

References
 Zavera Snowfield SCAR Composite Antarctic Gazetteer.
 Bulgarian Antarctic Gazetteer. Antarctic Place-names Commission. (details in Bulgarian, basic data in English)

External links
 Zavera Snowfield. Copernix satellite image

 

Glaciers of Trinity Peninsula
Bulgaria and the Antarctic